Walter de Thornbury (died 1313) was an English-born statesman and cleric in 14th century Ireland who held the office of Lord Chancellor of Ireland. His efforts to secure confirmation of his election as Archbishop of Dublin were cut short by his death in a shipwreck.

Biography
Walter de Thornbury was born in Herefordshire, where he was later granted the manor of Wolferlow by the Mortimer family, with whom he was always closely associated. He was an executor of the will of Edmund Mortimer, 2nd Baron Mortimer,  and was authorised by Edmund's widow Margaret de Fiennes to act as her attorney (jointly with Adam de Harvington, who like Walter was later to be a senior judge in Ireland) to recover her dowry, and other properties which had been held by Edmund. He was appointed guardian to their son Roger Mortimer, 1st Earl of March. Given Roger's later role as the usurper, and probably the killer of King Edward II, it is ironic that Walter owed his rise largely to his friendship with the King's favourite Piers Gaveston, who was Roger's co-guardian. He was much at Court in the years 1305-6.

Irish career

He was sent to Ireland as Chancellor of the Exchequer of Ireland in 1308 and became Lord Chancellor of Ireland the following year, following the death of Thomas  Cantock, on Piers Gaveston's recommendation. He was Deputy Treasurer of Ireland in 1311, and Treasurer and Cantor (Chief Singer) of St. Patrick's Cathedral in the same year, as a mark of royal favour (as the Archbishopric was vacant, the Treasurer's office was in the King's gift). He accompanied Gaveston on his successful campaign to restore the Crown's authority in Leinster in 1309, in which he defeated the O'Byrne clan of County Wicklow and restored order in the neighbourhood of Glendalough. The downfall and execution of his patron Gaveston in June 1312 does not seem to have injured Thornbury's career. A letter dating from the period 1309-12 survives, written by the Justiciar of Ireland to Walter, concerning the goods of a merchant of Cork which had been seized at Dieppe. 

In March of 1313, not long before his fatal journey to Avignon, he was on assize with William  Alysaundre, the itinerant justice for the county, at Cashel to hear the pleas for County Tipperary. The assize lasted eight days, and though the commission of appointment refers only to civil cases, it dealt with both civil and criminal business. The most notable criminal trial was of Walter Ohassy for the murder of John de Nash. Walter was found guilty and condemned to be hanged.

Death 
In 1313 he was one of two candidates for the Archbishopric of Dublin, the other being Alexander de Bicknor (William de Rodyard, Dean of St Patrick's Cathedral had also been nominated but had withdrawn his name). Thornbury, seemingly quicker off the mark than his rival, set out for Avignon to secure Papal confirmation of his election. The ship he was travelling on sank in a storm with the loss of all lives on board: the dead were reported to have numbered more than 150.

See also
 History of Ireland (1169–1536)#Norman decline (1300–1350)

References 

1313 deaths
Deaths due to shipwreck at sea
13th-century Irish Roman Catholic priests
People from Herefordshire
Year of birth unknown
Lord chancellors of Ireland
14th-century Irish Roman Catholic priests